Protschka is a surname. Notable people with the surname include:

 Josef Protschka (born 1944), German operatic tenor
  (born 1977), German trumpeter
 Stephan Protschka (born 1977), German politician